Gerry Lowe is a Canadian politician, who was elected to the Legislative Assembly of New Brunswick in the 2018 election. He represented the electoral district of Saint John Harbour as a member of the Liberal Party. He did not stand in the 2020 New Brunswick general election.

Prior to his election to the legislature, Lowe served on Saint John City Council. Lowe was reelected to the Saint John Common Council in 2021.

Electoral record

References

Living people
New Brunswick Liberal Association MLAs
21st-century Canadian politicians
Saint John, New Brunswick city councillors
Year of birth missing (living people)